De Doelen is a concert venue and convention centre in Rotterdam, Netherlands.  It was originally built in 1934 but then destroyed in 1940 during the German bombardment of Rotterdam in May 1940 at the outset of World War II.  It was rebuilt in 1966, originally with one hall to which two more were added in the 1990s.

It has a variety of facilities, including the Grote Zaal (Grand Hall), a 2,200-seat concert hall, two smaller halls which each seat about 700 people, and convention rooms. In 2015 it was classified as a Rijksmonument.

Although mainly known as a venue for classical music, de Doelen is also a stage for jazz, world music and as the Central Boxoffice for the International Film Festival Rotterdam. 
It is also the home of the Rotterdam Philharmonic Orchestra.

See also
 List of convention centres in the Netherlands

References

External links
 Official web site (in Dutch)

Buildings and structures in Rotterdam
Concert halls in the Netherlands
Convention centres in the Netherlands
Rijksmonuments in Rotterdam
Tourist attractions in Rotterdam